Polytremis pellucida is a butterfly belonging to the family Hesperiidae.

Subspecies
 Polytremis pellucida pellucida - Japan, South Sakhalin, Kunashir and Shikotan Islands. The only indication for continental Russia (Fujioka et al., 1997) is based on a specimen from 19th century.
 Polytremis pellucida quanta Evans, 1949 - China: Guniujiang, Anhui
 Polytremis pellucida asahinai Shirozu, 1952 - Taiwan
 Polytremis pellucida inexpecta Tsukiyama, Chiba & Fujioka, 1997 - China: Zhejiang

Description
Upperside of the forewings is dark brown, with a row of small white spots and markings. Also the  hindwings are dark brown and have four elongate to ovoid white spots.

Host plants
Larvae of this species feed on plants of the family Poaceae. Among the host plants are reported Miscanthus sinensis, Oryza sativa and some unidentified species of the genera Phragmites and Sasa.

Distribution
Polytremis pellucida is present in eastern Asia, in the Indomalayan realm and in the Palearctic realm.

References

Hesperiinae
Butterflies described in 1875
Butterflies of Asia